In enzymology, a phosphopolyprenol glucosyltransferase is an enzyme that catalyzes the chemical reaction

UDP-glucose + polyprenyl phosphate  UDP + polyprenylphosphate-glucose

Thus, the two substrates of this enzyme are UDP-glucose and polyprenyl phosphate, whereas its two products are UDP and polyprenylphosphate-glucose.

This enzyme belongs to the family of glycosyltransferases, specifically the hexosyltransferases.  The systematic name of this enzyme class is UDP-glucose:phosphopolyprenol D-glucosyltransferase. Other names in common use include uridine diphosphoglucose-polyprenol monophosphate, glucosyltransferase, and UDP-glucose:polyprenol monophosphate glucosyltransferase.

References

 

EC 2.4.1
Enzymes of unknown structure